West Brownsville is a former important transportation nexus and a present-day borough in Washington County, Pennsylvania, United States and part of the Pittsburgh metropolitan area. The population was 972 at the 2020 census. Culturally, by postal route, and socially, the community is connected to cross-river sister-city Brownsville, for the two were long joined by the Amerindian trail known as Nemacolin's Path that became a wagon road after the American Revolution, but West Brownsville is a separate municipality. Brownsville was the first point where the descent from the Appalachians could safely reach the river down the generally steep banks of the Monongahela River.  Between Brownsville and West Brownsville was a shallow stretch, usable as a river ford astride a major Emigrant Trail to the various attractive regions in the Northwest Territory, the first National Road, the Cumberland Pike (Now U.S. Route 40).

Geography
West Brownsville is located at  (40.029731, -79.886412).

History
West Brownsville sited on the inside of the sweeping curve along the Monongahela River was blessed with relatively level ground opposite the cut bank effect giving Brownsville relatively steep slopes and West Brownsville, cupped by the inside of the curve, more flood prone sandy mud flats lands. Historically, at a bit upstream of the location of the Brownsville-West Brownsville Bridge was the Amerindian crossing ford and wagon road of early westward migrants. A few hundred yards west from the shoreline, PA Route 88 enters from along the riverside bluff and the south as Lowhill Road and hugs the foot of the steep Pennsylvania hillsides flanking tongue-shaped flat terrain of the streets and housing through most of the length of W. Brownsville before twisting left uphill. It exits the W. Brownsville flat climbing Northwest as Blainsburg Road, climbing beside and below the bluff of Blainsburg, a larger 'satellite' bedroom community really an extension of the community, situated above West Brownsville proper, to its North-Northwest.
 
The steep bluff behind the West Brownsville tongue provided two climbable ascents which became early U.S. roads; the more southerly heading nearly due west climbing steadily upwards over a  stretch, an old wagon road, and later the National Road following the westward extension of Nemacolin's Path up to and through the outlier neighborhood known as Malden from a river-shallows area known as a ford to Amerindians, a landscape feature which attracted settlers heading west on the Emigrant Trail once known as Nemacolin's Path, then the Cumberland Road and then renamed as the 'National Road'. The other ascent would allow PA Route 88 to climb out of the valley where the road cut across several loops of the Monongahela to California.

Transportation and Railroad 

Sundered by the county boundaries running down the center of the river, West Brownsville economically was integrated with cross-river Brownsville by a ferry dating back into the early 1800s when Brownsville became a riverboat building and outfitting center. With construction of boats on nearby large tributaries, the shallow banks of West Brownsville were a favorite location to tie up and outfit a new built water craft to outfit it and load cargoes. The modern-day Main Street is notable for featuring on-street running by freight trains down the center of the street. Considered one railroad crossing, it is one of the longest crossings in the United States. Along with right bank Brownsville on the opposite shore, West Brownsville and Brownsville hosted extensive rail yards jammed into the tight confines along both banks of the Monongahela River. One special feature at either end of the two railyards was they each shared a bridge joining two river crossing wyes that tied together to contain a rare true-life reversing loop, normally a feature only found in model railroading layouts. The yards serviced the extensive rail hopper car deliveries feeding the coking ovens up river along the southside of Brownsville, and were integral parts of the famous Pittsburgh Steel Industries. The Monongahela Railroad represented the Lake Erie, the PRR, and the B&O, and Norfolk and Western both utilized the trackage in the towns, which today is operated by the N&W's successor, Norfolk Southern with the Monongahela vanishing into the CONRAIL debacle.

Demographics

As of the census of 2000, there were 1,075 people, 459 households, and 312 families residing in the borough. The population density was 831.7 people per square mile (321.8/km2). There were 527 housing units at an average density of 407.7 per square mile (157.7/km2). The racial makeup of the borough was 98.14% White, 0.65% African American, 0.09% Native American, 0.74% from other races, and 0.37% from two or more races. Hispanic or Latino of any race were 0.37% of the population.

There were 459 households, out of which 24.4% had children under the age of 18 living with them, 51.0% were married couples living together, 10.5% had a female householder with no husband present, and 32.0% were non-families. 27.9% of all households were made up of individuals, and 15.0% had someone living alone who was 65 years of age or older. The average household size was 2.34 and the average family size was 2.82.

In the borough the population was spread out, with 16.8% under the age of 18, 10.1% from 18 to 24, 25.5% from 25 to 44, 25.5% from 45 to 64, and 22.0% who were 65 years of age or older. The median age was 43 years. For every 100 females, there were 96.5 males. For every 100 females age 18 and over, there were 94.3 males.

The median income for a household in the borough was $27,315, and the median income for a family was $36,641. Males had a median income of $31,964 versus $21,875 for females. The per capita income for the borough was $15,368. About 10.4% of families and 13.5% of the population were below the poverty line, including 33.3% of those under age 18 and 5.4% of those age 65 or over.

Notes

Notable person
James G. Blaine - United States Secretary of State and Republican Presidential Candidate

References

Boroughs in Washington County, Pennsylvania
Populated places established in 1831
Pittsburgh metropolitan area
Pennsylvania populated places on the Monongahela River